Ernest Terrell (April 4, 1939 – December 16, 2014) was an American professional boxer who competed from 1957 to 1973. He unsuccessfully fought the other world  heavyweight champion of the era, Muhammad Ali, in a heavyweight title unification contest in 1967, losing by a  unanimous decision. Terrell was the elder brother of the Supremes' early 1970s lead singer Jean Terrell. In the 1960s, Jean sang with Ernie's group Ernie Terrell & the Heavyweights.

Early life
Terrell was born on 4 April 1939 in Inverness, Mississippi, and spent his early childhood in Belzoni. He was born into a family of ten children, whose father was a Mississippi sharecropper who during Terrell's childhood moved the family north to Chicago when he found employment in the factories there. Terrell received his formal education at Farragut School in Chicago. Before turning professional, he won the Chicago Golden Gloves in his youth as a light heavyweight, and he also formed a pop music singing act called "The Heavyweights" with three of his siblings.

Professional career
In his early career, Terrell defeated some good contenders, including Cleveland Williams (Terrell won a rematch with Williams by decision after losing their first fight by knockout), Zora Folley, and future light heavyweight champion Bob Foster.

When the World Boxing Association stripped Muhammad Ali of his title after his agreement to fight a rematch with Sonny Liston, the WBA matched Terrell and Eddie Machen for the vacant crown. Terrell defeated Machen to win the belt on March 5, 1965. During his reign as WBA champion, he defended the title twice, beating Doug Jones and George Chuvalo. Most in the boxing world continued to recognize Ali as the legitimate champion, for he had not lost his championship in a boxing match. The WBA's rival, the World Boxing Council, also continued to recognize Ali as champion. On March 29, 1966, Ali and Terrell were scheduled to fight, but Terrell backed out (Ali won a 15-round decision against substitute opponent George Chuvalo).

On February 6, 1967, Ali and Terrell finally met to end the debate about who was the legitimate heavyweight champion. Before the bout, Terrell repeatedly called Ali by his birth name. He said later that he had known "Clay" for years in the amateurs and hadn't gotten used to calling him another name. Ali took offense to this, and vowed he would punish Terrell. For his part, Ali further stoked the prefight ill-will by labeling Terrell "an Uncle Tom nigger who is going to get his ass whupped". Ali won by unanimous decision, reclaiming the undisputed championship. The Daily Telegraph wrote that the resulting fight was "the nastiest display of Ali's celebrated ring career", describing how he seized Terrell in a headlock and dragged Terrell's eye along the top rope, and declared, "The fight will be remembered for Ali's constant taunts of 'what's my name?' to an opponent he was apparently content not merely to defeat, but also to belittle and humiliate." The match is recounted in the film Ali.

Terrell lost an upset 12-round decision to Thad Spencer later in 1967 in the WBA heavyweight tournament that was organized after Ali was stripped of his title in April 1967. He left the sport for three years following the loss, but returned in 1970, winning seven consecutive fights before losing to Chuck Wepner by decision. The Wepner decision was highly controversial; most who saw the fight thought Terrell had won. After losing to Jeff Merritt in his next fight by a 1st round technical knockout, Terrell retired.

In 55 professional fights, Terrell earned a record of 46 wins (21 by knockout), nine losses and no draws.

Later life
After retiring from boxing he began a career as a record producer in Chicago. He ran unsuccessfully for alderman of Chicago's 34th ward in 1987. He finished second in the primary but lost to Lemuel Austin in a runoff.

Death
Terrell died at the age of 75 on December 16, 2014, in a hospital at Evergreen Park, Illinois, he had been afflicted in his final years with dementia. He was buried in Mount Hope Cemetery, Chicago.

Personal life
Terrell married Maxine Sibley in 1974; the couple raised two children.

Professional boxing record

References

Further reading

External links

1939 births
2014 deaths
African-American musicians
Boxers from Mississippi
Heavyweight boxers
People from Belzoni, Mississippi
Record producers from Mississippi
World heavyweight boxing champions
World Boxing Association champions
American male boxers
Deaths from dementia in Illinois
Farragut Career Academy alumni
20th-century African-American people